, also known as Soul Hunter, is a Japanese manga series by Ryu Fujisaki. Hoshin Engi is inspired by the Chinese literary classic Investiture of the Gods, a shenmo novel. The story involves the Chinese mythology and history of China, in particular the last members of the In (Yin dynasty aka Shang dynasty) and the plot to overthrow them. The manga series was serialized in Shueisha's Weekly Shōnen Jump magazine from 1996 to 2000, with its chapters collected in 23 tankōbon volumes. Fujisaki also wrote a short manga series that was serialized in Weekly Young Jump from April to June 2018. In North America, Viz Media licensed the manga for English language release.

A 26-episode anime television series titled Senkaiden Hōshin Engi was broadcast on TV Tokyo from July to December 1999. A second 23-episode anime television series adaptation titled Hakyū Hōshin Engi aired from January to June 2018. The first anime series was first licensed by ADV Films and released as Soul Hunter in 2001. It was later acquired by Discotek Media in 2016. Hōshin Engi had over 22 million copies in circulation, and is one of the best selling manga series of all time.

Synopsis

Setting
The fantastic world of Hoshin Engi encompass both the pre-historical world—in which primitive human society coexist with the revered divine gods and goddesses—and the futuristic world—in which highly technological weaponry, combat strategy, as well as futuristic visions, are employed. Paopei, the sacred weapons used by Doshi and Sennin alike, are versatile instruments created Sennin.

The Seven Super Paopei were the ones left from the Original People, and all the rest are copies made from those. Paopei can only be used by Sendou, those born with Sennin bones which are trained to be used to power paopei. If someone born with these bones is not trained, then they become a Tennen Doushi, and the potential of their skeleton creates almost super natural strength or speed; however, they would never be able to use a Paopei. It is possible to transplant Sennin bones into a normal human, as in the case with Younin, but it does not appear to be a common practice. There are such beings as "human Paopei," that is, a living being created from a paopei. They all have a core they are built around, and can take extensive damage and be rebuilt so long as the core remains intact.

Besides paopei, there are spells, an ancient form a magic rarely used by the time series takes place. The only ones seen in the series are the peaches that can turn water into sake, Yang Jian's transformation technique, and Randeng's various fighting and healing abilities.

Plot

The story is set in legendary China. A beautiful female fox spirit named  is controlling the emperor  and the ruling  dynasty, and is using her power over him to do evil in the nation. An immortal-in-training named  is chosen by the great immortal sages for the —to seal away or destroy the evil demons that infest the world. In the course of his adventures, Taigong Wang gathers other powerful companions and sets out to seal away the demons and eventually destroy the fox spirit Daji.

There are significant plot differences between the novel, the manga series and the animated adaptations.

Manga plot
The 23-volume-long series follows the adventures of Taigong Wang and his trusty  .

The goal of the Hoshin Project, as explained by Yuanshi Tianzun, is to trap Daji and her minions in a 'middle' world between the Sennin World and the Human world, renamed  (Deity or Gods) World, named 'Shinkai', Realm of the Gods. Taigong Wang's mission is to hunt down the 365 people whose names were written on the Hoshin Scroll. As Taigong Wang defeats and seals off each of the 365 people on the scroll, their souls are instantly transported to the Hoshindai (a floating island made to trap souls) and sealed there until all the 365 souls are gathered.

At first, Taigong Wang refused to take up such a troublesome mission, but when threatened with expulsion from Kunlun, he quickly relented.

Upon leaving Kunlun, Taigong Wang and Sibuxiang immediately met up with the first person listed on the Hoshin Scroll, the all-powerful  and his Riding Beast—Kokutenko (黒点虎). After a short battle between the two , in which Taigong Wang was easily defeated, Taigong Wang suspected that the order of the Hoshin Scroll is sorted according to strength (Shen Gongbao being the first on the list) and decides to avoid fighting him. Aiming for the core of the whole problem, he enters the capital, Zhaoge and defeating one of Daji's sisters,  (who reverted to her original form, a stone lute), he used her to enter the service of the emperor in order to spot Daji's weakness. Furious with her sister's plight, Daji contrives a plan to reclaim her sister. Taigong Wang, overwhelmed by her guile, was defeated and was about to be thrown into the taibon (a pit full of poisonous snakes) along with some of the Kyou clan, when during a commotion caused by them,  saved him. It was then that he came to a realization that there was no way he could take on Daji and her followers, on his own. That's why he set off searching for strong fighters to join him on his quest to rid the world of Daji.

As the series progresses, Taigong Wang slowly realises that there is no hope in disrupting Daji's strangle hold on the Yin dynasty or her influence over Emperor Zhou. As such, he abandoned the kingdom and requested that  form a new monarchy to rival the Yin, renamed the Zhou dynasty with their new emperor—, who is the second son of  who had died due to self-starvation caused by Daji serving him his son as a hamburger during his capture. Taigong Wang then became the military advisor to Zhou, helping the Western Army conquer the lands once owned by Yin.

, the senior advisor to the Emperor Zhou in the country of Yin and also a pao-pei user, sees Taigong Wang as an obstacle and sends out some of his best Doushi companions to attack Taigong Wang and company. At the climax of the Sennin war, both worlds were completely destroyed with hundreds of souls sealed into the Houshin Dai. And though Wen Zhong was eventually defeated, Taigong Wang lost many friends and his home in the process.

Eventually, after Taigong Wang and the Zhou army successfully defeated Emperor Zhou and officially declared the fall of the Yin dynasty, Taigong Wang and company decided to leave the human world and return to what's left of the Sennin world. It is then revealed to him that there is possibly a third Sennin World, one that belongs to Daji, and is probably where she and the last of her minions fled to when the Yin country was finally conquered.

Yuanshi Tianzun also reveals to Taigong Wang that the real goal of Hoshin Project isn't just about defeating Daji, it is about defeating the eternal being supporting Daji throughout all her chaos years , one of the ancients.

The ultimate enemy of Hoshin Engi, Nüwa, is a "Jui Que", one of five 'aliens' which landed on the Earth, millions of years ago. Nüwa had a dream to recreate her home world on Earth (which had self-destructed some time ago), but the other aliens disagreed and enclosed her in a glass cage. Later, she was able to move about in her "soul" form and direct the trend of history to her liking. This is when she met up with Daji, and the two started working together to make Nüwa's dream come true. Each time history diverted from what Nüwa wants it to become, she completely destroyed the civilization that existed and started all over again, like a child moulding a perfect sand castle. No one really knows how many civilisations Nüwa had destroyed throughout time in her pursuit to perfectly replicate her old home, but when asked why she's trying to do this, Nüwa simply states that she would like to know what would have happened if her home planet had not made those simple mistakes that led to its own destruction.

After hearing the ultimate truth, the Sennins retaliated against Nüwa. Soon, she finally decided to destroy Earth once and for all, and find another world in order to replicate her old home. The battles raged for a while before the deceased Taigong Wang (who had 'died' recently) reappeared in front of his comrades again. This time, it is revealed that he was once one of the "Jui Que" as well, the last of the 5 aliens and was left on this earth for the sole purpose of killing Nüwa once and for all. Using the energy of his friends as well as those souls trapped in the Houshin Dai, Taigong Wang (now renamed ) was finally able to defeat Nüwa and release the world from her influences.

Just prior to this happening, Daji somehow managed to take over Nüwa's body for a time and merged with the life energies of the Earth, becoming the mother of all life. After the fight with Nüwa ended, Nüwa selfishly asked Taigong Wang to disappear together with her, afraid of being left alone again and since Taigong Wang felt that he had done what he had set out to do, complies (also due to severe injuries in the last fight). When he was about to fade away, Daji came and saved his life, thus reviving him.

Yuanshi Tianzun manages the ex-Houshindai, which houses all the souls which had been hoshin'ed, and dispatches them to the Human World if their help is needed. Since these souls are invisible to the Human eye, they are able to solve matters without being seen. When Sibuxiang and  went to the Human World to update King Wu on the happenings of the Sennin World, they found out that Taigong Wang is still alive (he visited King Wu before they arrived) and went in search for him but to no avail as Taigong Wang seemed keen on avoiding them to the extent of following them behind their backs without them knowing, and somehow prevents the people they meet from revealing his whereabouts.

In the end, Sibuxiang and Wu Ji returned to the Sennin World to request Yang Jian's help. While Taigong Wang was lazing around, Shen Gongbao approached him and wanted a duel, but he left saying that it would be boring if his only rival were to perish so quickly by his hand. Taigong Wang then disappeared to places unknown.

Anime plot
The 26-episode anime storyline somewhat follows the main plot of the manga, with the young (72-year-old) "doushi" (Apprentice to a Sennin) Taigong Wang told to go from the Sennin (Immortal) world to Earth (and specifically Yin China) to hunt down 365 renegade evil spirits in order to bring down the fall of Queen Daji, a Fox spirit who has enslaved the Emperor.

Taigong Wang recruits Nezha, a human/weapon hybrid, and Leizhenzi, a would-be vigilante, in his quest to hunt down Daji. He is later joined by Yang Jian, the Tensai (Genius) Doushi of Kunlun and Huang Tianhua, the son of the duke Huang Feihu. He also rides a talking 'hippopotamus' (actually a Reijuu) named Sibuxiang, who remains the most popular character of the series.

Ji Chang, the Lord of the West, is a man who is unwittingly destined to found the Zhou dynasty. Imprisoned for trying to stop Daji's evil, he suffers a grievous guilt when his son is murdered and served to him as a meal, causing him to refrain from eating. Escaping from his captors, he returns with an army to overthrow the Yin with the help of Taigong Wang.

In the midst of this historical drama, the Immortal High Council (a group of three Immortals seemingly of a higher position than Yuanshi Tianzun) is plotting some form of magical spell that requires the capturing of many souls, which made them deliberately lie about the purpose of the Hoshin Project to Taigong Wang.

The anime ends with Daji's death due to the combined efforts of Taigong Wang's group and Shen Gongbao, with the Juunisen making a short appearance near the end and no mention of Nüwa.

Media

Manga
Hoshin Engi, written and illustrated by Ryu Fujisaki, is based on the Japanese translation novel by Tsutomu Ano of the Chinese literary classic Investiture of the Gods, published by Kodansha between November 8, 1988, and January 6, 1989. The manga was serialized in Shueisha's shōnen manga magazine Weekly Shōnen Jump from June 24, 1996, to November 6, 2000. Shueisha collected its 204 individual chapters in twenty-three tankōbon volumes, released from November 1, 1996, to December 22, 2000. The manga has been re-released and re-compiled into fewer larger volumes with new cover art, illustrations and afterwords. An eighteen-volume kanzenban edition was released between July 4, 2005, and April 4, 2006.

In North America, Viz Media announced at the New York Comic Con 2007 that they had licensed the manga. The twenty-three volumes were published from June 5, 2007, to June 7, 2011.

Fujisaki wrote a short manga series that was serialized in Weekly Young Jump from April 26 to June 14, 2018. A tankōbon volume was released on July 19, 2018.

Anime

First series (1999)
Hoshin Engi was adapted into an anime television series titled Senkaiden Hōshin Engi, produced by Studio Deen and directed by Junji Nishimura. The 26-episodes series was broadcast on TV Tokyo between July 3 and December 25, 1999.

In North America, the series was first licensed by ADV Films in 2001 under the name Soul Hunter. In 2016, Discotek Media re-licensed the series for a single DVD collection release on June 28.

In January 2009, Shomei TV announced their intentions to remake the anime series if they received 10,000 signatures.

Second series (2018)
A new 23-episode anime television series adaptation titled Hakyū Hōshin Engi, produced by C-Station and featuring a new cast aired from January 12 to June 29, 2018. The series is directed by Masahiro Aizawa, with Natsuko Takahashi in charge of the series scripts, characters design by Yoshimitsu Yamashita and music composed by Maiko Iuchi. Crunchyroll streamed the series, while Funimation produced a simuldub.

Stage play
A stage play musical adaptation titled Musical Hoshin Engi - Mezame no Toki (Musical Hoshin Engi - Time of Awakening) was performed in EX Theater Roppongi in Tokyo and ran from January 13 to 20, 2019. The play, directed by Kōtarō Yoshitani, included casts such as Shōhei Hashimoto playing as Taikōbō, Yuya Asato as Yozen, and Ryū Kiyama as Nataku.

Other media
A video game based on the manga was created for the PlayStation and the Wonderswan. Several audio dramas were released in 2005.

Four characters of Hoshin Engi appear in Jump Ultimate Stars for Nintendo DS. Out of these, only Taikobo can be controlled by the player. The other three appear as either support (So Dakki) or help komas (Otenkun and Subushan).

Reception
On TV Asahi's Manga Sōsenkyo 2021 poll, in which 150.000 people voted for their top 100 manga series, Hoshin Engi ranked #68.

See also
 Mystic Heroes, a Japanese video game also based on Investiture of the Gods

References

Further reading

External links

  
  
 Ex:Magazine review of the TV series
 

1988 Japanese novels
1996 manga
1999 anime television series debuts
ADV Films
Adventure anime and manga
C-Station
Chinese mythology in anime and manga
Crunchyroll anime
Discotek Media
Funimation
Historical fantasy anime and manga
Kodansha books
NBCUniversal Entertainment Japan
Science fantasy anime and manga
Seinen manga
Shenmo fiction
Shōnen manga
Shueisha franchises
Shueisha manga
Studio Deen
Television shows based on Investiture of the Gods
TV Tokyo original programming
Viz Media manga
Works based on Investiture of the Gods